The Australian Capital Territory Legislative Assembly Building, also known as the South Building, is located on the southern side of Civic Square, London Circuit, Civic in the Australian Capital Territory.

History
The building was designed as one part of the Canberra Civic Square, also incorporating the Canberra Theatre and Museum, in 1959–1961 by Roy Simpson of Yuncken Freeman for the National Capital Development Commission. Originally was known as the "Civic Offices", they were originally built to house the offices of the ACT Advisory Council, the ACT Industrial Court and the Department of the Interior. The modernist-style building has been the home of the Australian Capital Territory Legislative Assembly since 1994 after it was refurbished to accommodate the Chamber and provide space for offices. The Assembly first met during 1989 in a temporary Chamber at 1 Constitution Avenue.

The ACT Coat of Arms over the entrance were designed by Lenore Bass, wife of Tom Bass who created the "Ethos" sculpture in Civic Square, and unveiled in September 1961.

References

External links

 ACT Legislative Assembly website

Office buildings in Canberra
Modernist architecture in Australia
International Style (architecture)
Legislative buildings in Australia
Parliament of the Australian Capital Territory
Government buildings completed in 1961
1961 establishments in Australia